Faisal Ali (born 20 October 1999) is an Indian professional footballer who plays as an attacking midfielder or winger for I-League club Mohammedan, on loan from Indian Super League club Bengaluru.

Career

Early career
Born in India, Faisal Ali started his professional football career with Bhawanipore FC. He was also part of Bhawanipore which played I-League Qualifiers which held in October 2020.

Mohammedan SC
On 7 November 2020, Faisal joined I-league club Mohammedan SC on a 2-year deal. On 9 January 2021, Faisal made his debut for Mohammedan and on 58th minute he scored his first goal for the club.

Career statistics

Club

Honours
Mohammedan Sporting
Calcutta Football League: 2021
I-League: 2021–22

Bengaluru
 Durand Cup: 2022

References

1999 births
Living people
Indian footballers
Southern Samity players
Association football midfielders
Footballers from Kolkata
I-League players
Bhawanipore FC players
Mohammedan SC (Kolkata) players
Bengaluru FC players